Tanumānasī is the third stage or bhumika of wisdom in the waking state, at which stage the mind, through development of profound indifference towards objects, is stated to become as thin as a thread - Tanu means 'thread' and manas means the 'mind'. During this stage of awakening the aspirant gives up all hankering after sensual objects.

The seven stages of wisdom that characterize a Jivanmukta were mentioned by Ribhu to his son, Nidāgha,  in the Varahu Upanishad, which stages are – a) Shubhecha ('good desire or intention'), b) Vicharana ('enquiry and contemplation'), c) Tanumanasi ('the mind rid of hankering after objects'), d) Sattvapatti ('the purified Chit resting on the Atman'), e) Asamsakti ('perfect non-attachment to objects'), f) Padartha-bhavana ('analysis of objects or love for objects'), g) Turiyattita ('superconsciouness' or moksha). With the first three stages working amidst differences and non-differences in the waking state  the aspirant i.e. the seeker after Truth, is called Mumukshu. The first three stages or bhumikas viz; the good intention to pursue the right path, the investigation into ways and means required for gain of knowledge, and the attenuation of the mind, are under the Jagrat ('waking') state when awake one sees the universe and assumes it to be really existent; the third stage is also called Asanga-bhavana in which stage if death occurs the human being is re-born on earth as a jnani ('wise person') after spending a longer time in the heaven. These seven stages are also termed as the seven essential qualifications required for experiencing the highest bliss.

In order to experience the truth about one’s own self a preparation through investigation into one’s own true nature and meditation is required, rising above the body-thought, to reach the stage of tanumanasi to directly apprehend pure awareness, as long as man does not give identification of the atman with the body etc; till then he does not get liberated, this wrong identification is required to be renounced, this is rising above the body-thought.

References

Vedanta
Sanskrit words and phrases